Bangin' on Wax 2... The Saga Continues is the second and last album by the Bloods & Crips. Music videos were made for G's & Locs and Wish You Were Here.

Track listing

Samples
"G's and Locs"
"I Wanna Do Something Freaky to You" by Leon Haywood
"Mafia Lane"
"Mary Jane" by Rick James
"Time Is Gone Nigga"
"Do Your Thing" by Isaac Hayes
"Every Dog Has His Day"
"Got To Be Real" by Cheryl Lynn

Chart Awards

Trivia
"G's and Locs" has the same beat - albeit slightly modified - as the track "Shuda Beena B-Dog" from the previous album Bangin' on Wax.

References 

Bloods & Crips albums
1994 albums
Albums produced by Silkski
Sequel albums
Gangsta rap albums by American artists
G-funk albums